"Medicine" is a song by British rock band Bring Me the Horizon. Produced by the band's vocalist Oliver Sykes and keyboardist Jordan Fish, it is featured on the group's 2019 sixth studio album Amo. The track was released as the third single from the album on 3 January 2019.

Composition and lyrics
"Medicine" has been described as a pop, pop rock, electropop, and alternative rock song. It has aggressive and directly angry lyrics, contrasting with romantic love songs like "Mother Tongue". The song centres around Oliver Sykes' last relationship with Hannah Snowdon. Their marriage ended in a messy divorce in early 2016. While Sykes has explained that the song "Ouch" also talks about that situation, keyboardist Jordan Fish revealed that "Medicine" is "connected to that too." Fish said of the song's lyrics:

Music video
The music video for "Medicine" was released on the same day as the single was streamed. It is an effects-laden clip, courtesy of animator Extraweg and art director Oliver Latta. According to music website Consequence of Sound, the video shows "a statue-like bust of singer Oli Sykes' head as it is engorged by a plague of demon-like representations of himself". AltPress described it as "freaky, CGI".

Personnel
Credits adapted from Tidal.

Bring Me the Horizon
 Oliver Sykes – lead vocals, production, composition
 Lee Malia – guitars, composition
 Matt Kean – bass, composition
 Matt Nicholls – drums, composition
 Jordan Fish – keyboards, synthesizers, programming, percussion, backing vocals, production, composition

Additional musicians
 Choir Noir – choir

Additional personnel
 Romesh Dodangoda – engineering
 Francesco Cameli – assistant engineering
 Alejandro Baima – assistant engineering
 Daniel Morris – assistant engineering
 Ted Jensen – mastering
 Rhys May – mixing
 Dan Lancaster – mixing

Charts

Certifications

References

2019 singles
2019 songs
Bring Me the Horizon songs
British pop rock songs
Electropop songs
RCA Records singles
Songs written by Oliver Sykes
Sony Music singles